Matthew Roy Sanders  is a parenting researcher and professor at the University of Queensland in Brisbane, Queensland, Australia. In 2018, he was named as one of the Queensland Greats by Queensland Premier Annastacia Palaszczuk in a ceremony at the Queensland Art Gallery on 8 June 2018.

Sanders is the founder of the iconic Positive Parenting Program, known as Triple P. The program is a world leader in its approaches to parenting and family interventions. Hundreds of thousands of families across Queensland and Australia have already benefited from the program that has been translated into 22 languages and used in 28 countries by more than 76,000 accredited practitioners. Professor Sanders’ expertise is highly valued by policy makers all around the world and has advised many institutions including the Queensland Health Paediatric Advisory Panel, Education Queensland, National Suicide Prevention Council, US Ministry of Health, the Council of Europe, and the World Health Organization. Professor Sanders continues to be one of the world's most highly cited parenting researchers.

Sanders was elected a Fellow of the Academy of the Social Sciences in Australia in 2016. In the 2020 Australia Day Honours Sanders was appointed an Officer of the Order of Australia (AO) for "distinguished service to education and research in clinical psychology, and to child, parent and family wellbeing".

References

Attribution 
This article was based on material from 2018 Queensland Greats recipients © The State of Queensland 2018, released under CC-BY-4.0 license, accessed on 27 October 2018.

External links

People from Queensland
Queensland Greats
Academic staff of the University of Queensland
Living people
Year of birth missing (living people)
Officers of the Order of Australia
Fellows of the Academy of the Social Sciences in Australia
University of Auckland alumni